Jakob Streitle (11 December 1916 – 24 June 1982) was a German footballer. During the course of his career, he played as a defender for Bayern Munich.

He was capped by the Germany national team a total of 15 times between 1938 and 1952. Streitle was a member of the German squad that took part in the FIFA World Cup 1938 in France, where he made his international debut in the round of 16 replay against Switzerland.

During World War II, Streitle served as an officer in the German Army.

References

External links
 
 
 

1916 births
1982 deaths
German footballers
FC Bayern Munich footballers
Germany international footballers
1938 FIFA World Cup players
German football managers
FC Bayern Munich managers
Association football defenders
German Army officers of World War II